Mitchell Kriegman (born June 4, 1952) is an American television writer, director, producer, consultant, story editor, author, composer and actor. He is the creator of Clarissa Explains It All (1991) for Nickelodeon, Bear in the Big Blue House (1997) and The Book of Pooh (2001) for Disney Channel and It's a Big Big World (2006) for PBS. Kriegman holds patents for a method of hybrid animation, known as Shadowmation, which combines high-definition virtual-environments with puppets and animatronics, composited and rendered in real time. The production technique was implemented in The Book of Pooh and It's a Big Big World.

Kriegman's first novel was Being Audrey Hepburn (2014). A second novel, Things I Can't Explain, is a reimagining of the protagonist in the Clarissa Explains It All television series, in her twenties, published in November 2015.

Career and education
Kriegman attended Bennington College in Bennington, Vermont, earning a BA in Literature in 1974.

He began his career as a writer, video-artist and performance-artist, under the pseudonym Marshall Klugman. An Evening of Stories and Tricks You Won’t See Anywhere, was performed at Dance Theater Workshop in New York City and surrounding venues. His video work of this period includes,  The Marshall Klugman Show (1975) which aired on WNET television. As a short story writer, his work has been published in The New Yorker, Between C & D, the National Lampoon, Glamour, George Meyer's Army Man magazine and Harper’s Bazaar.

The Telephone Stories (1979) is Kriegman's series of audio-plays for the telephone, one of the first installations of dial-in art. In addition to being available on a special phone-line, The Telephone Stories toured museums and galleries around the country, including the High Museum and The Boston Institute of Contemporary Art, after premiering at the Whitney Museum, as the department's first audio-only offering. Kriegman wrote and acted in Operation X segments for the PBS Series Alive from Off Center, which have been featured in the Walker Art Center and The Paley Center exhibits. During this period Kriegman collaborated with Bart Friedman and Nancy Cain of Videofreex on several pieces including "Turkey Dinner" (1982), a precursor to his full length My Neighborhood, funded by the American Film Institute, which aired on WNET/13, and featured a sad sack Kriegman gleefully greeting everyone in his neighborhood, who all ignore him.

Kriegman joined Saturday Night Live in 1980 (season 6), as a performer, writer and filmmaker.  During his time there, he made three films:The Dancing Man, Heart to Heart, and Someone is Hiding in My Apartment.  He appeared in the sketches "Blame The Kids" and "Virgin Search". He was also a contributor to Michael O'Donoghue's Mr. Mike's Mondo Video (1979), which included Kriegman's shorts, "Cleavage" and "This is a Man in a Dog Suit". A third piece, "The Dancing Belly Button", was not televised but was included in the Anthology Film Archives collection.  After leaving Saturday Night Live his work turned markedly toward children's and young adult television programming.
 
Mouseterpiece Theater (1983), hosted by George Plimpton, was directed by Kriegman and co-written with Robert Cunniff for The Disney Channel; the show was a spoof on Masterpiece Theatre, but instead of presenting serious works in film, Plimpton would introduce Disney cartoons. Further immersion into writing for children's television programming came from HBO's Encyclopedia (1988), and ALF Tales in 1988.

Kriegman produced The Sweet Life (1989), and a sketch-comedy program called Higgins Boys and Gruber (1989) for The Comedy Channel.

Moving to Nickelodeon, Kriegman became involved in the writing and development of Nicktoons in 1991, including Doug, Rugrats, and The Ren & Stimpy Show. Kriegman was nominated for a Primetime Emmy Award for The Ren & Stimpy Show in 1992.Rocko's Modern Life was added to the animated programming in 1993.

Kriegman was the creator and executive producer of Clarissa Explains It All starring Melissa Joan Hart. The series ran for four seasons and Kriegman was nominated for a Primetime Emmy Award in 1994, for Outstanding Children's Program.  CBS commissioned a pilot for a Clarissa sequel, continuing her story as a young working age adult, but the pilot was not picked up.

Mr. Willowby's Christmas Tree (1995), narrated by Kermit the Frog, and Twisted Puppet Theater (1996), had Kriegman writing for puppet characters. Kriegman created the Emmy Award-winning television series, Bear in the Big Blue House (1997), and created and  directed, The Book of Pooh (2001),  based on the Milne books, both in association with the Disney Channel. Cast with bunraku puppets, both series employed Kriegman's shadowmation technique.  Kriegman also wrote for Sesame Street characters in the feature film, The Adventures of Elmo in Grouchland (1999), co-written with Joey Mazzarino, and produced by The Jim Henson Company.

Kriegman is the creator, executive producer and co-director of It's a Big Big World which aired on PBS Kids from 2006- 2010.

As of 2015, Kriegman is a novelist, instructor, and guest-lecturer, living in the Southern California area, and an adjunct professor at the University College Dublin. Kriegman has taught webseries development and production and sitcom writing at Stony Brook Southampton, lectures at University of California, Santa Barbara (UCSB). Kriegman's second novel, Things I Can't Explain, based on the central character in Clarissa Explains it All, was published in 2015.

Filmography
Kriegman’s video-art works are in the Castelli-Sonnebend collection, as well as the Paley Center, Museum of Modern Art (MoMA), The Kitchen Center, and the London Institute of Contemporary Arts among others.

Television credits

Feature film credits

Awards
Kriegman has won three Daytime Emmy Awards and has been nominated for two Primetime Emmy Awards, he is the winner of the Directors Guild of America Award (1999), and has been nominated for a Writers Guild of America Award. Bear in the Big Blue House (1997) garnered him two Emmys for Best Direction (in 2000 and 2002), as well as the Directors Guild Award in 1999, and an additional nomination in 2000. His work on The Book of Pooh (2001) was recognized with a Best Direction Emmy in 2002. Other awards include three Parents Choice awards for Clarissa Explains It All (1991), "Clarissa and Peter and the Wolf", and the UNIMA-USA Citation of Excellence for Bear in the Big Blue House, and for The Book of Pooh. It's a Big Big World (2006) received a Webby award, two Emmy Nominations and two Environmental Media Award nominations.

|-
|1992
| Rugrats (1991) 
| Daytime Emmy Awards
|
|Outstanding Writing in an Animated Program
|-
| 1992
| The Ren & Stimpy Show
| Primetime Emmy Awards  
| 
| Outstanding Animated Program
|-
|1993
|Doug (1991) 
|CableACE Award 
|
|Animated Programming Special or Series
|-
|1993
|The Ren & Stimpy Show (1991)
|CableACE Award 
|
|Animated Programming Special or Series
|-
| 1994
| Clarissa Explains It All
| Primetime Emmy Awards 
| 
| Outstanding Children's Program
|-
|1998
|Bear in the Big Blue House (1997) 
| Daytime Emmy Awards
|
|Outstanding Pre-School Series
|-
|1999
|Bear in the Big Blue House (1997)
| Directors Guild of America
|
| Outstanding Directorial Achievement in Children's Programs, for "Love is All You Need"
|-
|2000
|Bear in the Big Blue House (1997) 
| Daytime Emmy Awards
|
|Outstanding Directing in a Children's Series
|-
|2000
|Mary Cassatt: An American Impressionist (1999) 
| Daytime Emmy Awards
|
|Outstanding Directing in a Children's Special
|-
|2000
|Bear in the Big Blue House (1997) 
| Daytime Emmy Awards
|
|Outstanding Pre-School Children's Series
|-
|2000
|Bear in the Big Blue House (1997)
| Directors Guild of America
|
| Outstanding Directorial Achievement in Children's Programs, for "A Berry Bear Christmas"
|-
|2001
|Bear in the Big Blue House (1997)
| Writers Guild of America
|
| Children's Script, for "A Berry Bear Christmas"
|-
|2002
|The Book of Pooh (2001) 
| Daytime Emmy Awards
|
|Outstanding Directing in a Children's Series
|-
|2003
|Bear in the Big Blue House (1997) 
| Daytime Emmy Awards
|
|Outstanding Directing in a Children's Series
|-
|2003
|Bear in the Big Blue House (1997) 
| Daytime Emmy Awards
|
|Outstanding Pre-School Children's Series
|-
|2004
|Bear in the Big Blue House (1997) 
| Daytime Emmy Awards
|
|Outstanding Pre-School Children's Series
|-
|2004
|Bear in the Big Blue House (1997) 
| Daytime Emmy Awards
|
|Outstanding Directing in a Children's Series
|-
|2005
|The Book of Pooh (2001) 
| Daytime Emmy Awards
|
|Outstanding Directing in a Children's Series
|-
|2006
|It's a Big Big World (2006) 
| Environmental Media Association Award 
|
|Children's Live Action Television 
|-
|2007
|It's a Big Big World (2006) 
| Daytime Emmy Awards
|
|Outstanding Directing in a Children's Series
|-
|2007
|It's a Big Big World (2006) 
| Daytime Emmy Awards
|
|Outstanding Pre-School Children's Series
|-
|2007
|It's a Big Big World (2006) 
| Environmental Media Association Award 
|
|Children's Live Action

|-
| colspan="5"| 
|}

Writing
Kriegman has contributed works to The New Yorker,  the National Lampoon, Glamour magazine, and Harper's Bazaar. At the community level, Kriegman serves as the executive editor for the Montecito Morning Mojo, he has written for the Santa Barbara Independent and the Los Angeles Review of Books (LARB).  As a screenwriter, Kriegman has written for Universal, Disney and Columbia Pictures. Kriegman created, produced and wrote screenplays for the television series, Clarissa Explains It All, He wrote the story and co-wrote the screenplay The Adventures of Elmo in Grouchland (1999) with Joey Mazzarino for The Jim Henson Company. Kriegman is a staff writer at the Montecito Journal, and creator of the Montecito Journal Morning Mojo.
 
 In July 2020, Kriegman donated his archives and working notes to the University of California, Santa Barbara, Performing Arts Collection. Portions of his performance art and video archives will go to the school's Design & Architecture Museum.

Books 
 Being Audrey Hepburn: A Novel (2014)  
In September 2015, New Form Digital (Brian Grazer - Ron Howard) announced plans to option Kriegman's novel, Being Audrey Hepburn, for screenplay.

 Things I Can’t Explain: A Clarissa Novel (2015)

Music
Kriegman is credited on Peter and the Wolf (1994), a Clarissa narrated version of the Sergei Prokofiev classic, featuring Clarissa & The Straightjackets. His additional songwriting credits are included in the collections: Songs from the Book of Pooh (2002) with Disney, including the closing theme with Brian Woodbury.  For the Bear in the Big Blue House series, Kriegman's music credits include: Songs from Jim Henson's Bear in the Big Blue House (2000), More Songs from Bear in the Big Blue House (2002),  Bear's Holiday Celebration (2002) and Greatest Hits (2005).

Innovation

Kriegman is credited with the patented design of the hybrid special-effects technique called Shadowmation, that combines live action puppets, animatronics, and computer animation utilizing video game engines and virtual environments.  He holds a variety of patents for hybrid animation technologies.

References

External links 
 
 

Living people
American male screenwriters
American television writers
American television producers
Daytime Emmy Award winners
Directors Guild of America Award winners
American performance artists
American video artists
Stony Brook University faculty
Bennington College alumni
1952 births
American male television writers
Screenwriters from New York (state)